The Village Free School (VFS) is a 501(c)(3) non-profit private primary and secondary school located in Portland, Oregon, United States.

The school was founded in 2004 and enrolls students between the ages of 5 and 18.

References

External links
 https://www.villagefreeschool.org

High schools in Portland, Oregon
Private elementary schools in Oregon
Private middle schools in Oregon
Education in Portland, Oregon
Democratic education
Private high schools in Oregon
2005 establishments in Oregon